Davud-e Peyghambar (also Romanized as Dāvūd-e Peyghambar, Dāūd Paighambar, Dāvūd Peyghambar, and Dāvūd Peyghamber) is a village in Japelaq-e Gharbi Rural District, Japelaq District, Azna County, Lorestan Province, Iran. At the 2006 census, its population was 160, in 39 families.

References 

Towns and villages in Azna County